Golden Screen TV Awards is a yearly awards night that recognizes the outstanding programs and personalities from different TV networks in the Philippines including ABS-CBN, TV5, GMA Network, among others.

It was created in 2004 by the Entertainment Press Society (ENPRESS), a group of entertainment writers from newspapers. Before the awards night (usually held in March), the ENPRESS members are taking reviews and deliberations of the nominees for three months.

List of Awards
Outstanding Educational Program & Program Host
Outstanding Lifestyle Program & Program Host
Outstanding Magazine Program & Program Host^
Outstanding Public Affairs Program & Program Host^
Outstanding Public Service Program & Program Host^
Outstanding Game/Talent Program & Program Host
Outstanding Celebrity Talk Program & Program Host
Outstanding Documentary Program & Program Host^
Outstanding News Program^
Outstanding Male/Female News Presenter^
Outstanding Showbiz Talk Program
Outstanding Male/Female Showbiz Talk Program Host
Outstanding Adapted Reality/Competition Program & Program Host
Outstanding Natural History/Wildlife Program & Program Host
Outstanding Crime/Investigative Program & Program Host
Outstanding News Magazine Program^
Outstanding Comedy Program
Outstanding Gag Program
Outstanding Musical Program
Outstanding Variety Program
Outstanding Male/Female Host in a Musical or Program
Outstanding Adapted Drama Program
Outstanding Original Drama Program
Outstanding Single Drama/Telemovie Program
Outstanding Breakthrough Performance by an Actor/Actress
Outstanding Supporting Actor/Actress in a Gag or Comedy Show
Gawad Dolphy Lifetime Achievement Awards

(^only added in 2011)

Helen Vela Lifetime Achievement Awards
Named after the actress, radio announcer and drama anthology host Helen Vela, the Helen Vela Lifetime Achievement Awards has been honored the distinguished achievements of personalities in Philippine television. It has 3 categories that will be presented this year, Drama, Comedy and News Broadcast.

See also

 List of Asian television awards
 PMPC Star Awards for Television

References

Philippine television awards
Awards established in 2004
2004 establishments in the Philippines